Pareeksha may refer to:

Pareeksha (1967 film), an Indian Malayalam-language film 
Pareeksha (2020 film), an Indian Hindi-language film